Sarab-e Ganj Ali (also Romanized as Sarāb-e Ganj ‘Ālī, Sarāb-e Ganj‘alī, and Sarāb Ganjāli) is a village in Beyranvand-e Jonubi Rural District, Bayravand District, Khorramabad County, Lorestan Province, Iran. At the 2006 census, its population was 131, in 28 families.

References

Towns and villages in Khorramabad County